James J. Gillogly (born 5 March 1946) is an American computer scientist and cryptographer.

Biography

Early life
His interest in cryptography stems from his boyhood, as did his interest in mathematics. By junior high he was inventing his own ciphers and challenging his father, entomologist Lorin Gillogly, to solve them.

Gillogly wrote a chess-playing program in the Fortran programming language in 1970, and in 1977 he ported the code for "Colossal Cave" from Fortran to C.

Education
He graduated from Carnegie Mellon University in 1978, receiving a Ph.D. in computer science. He was advised by Allen Newell, with his dissertation titled "Performance Analysis of the Technology Chess Program".

Career
Gillogly worked as a computer scientist at RAND, specializing in system design and development, and computer security. He has written several articles about technology and cryptography, is currently the editor of the "Cipher Exchange" column for The Cryptogram, and was president of the American Cryptogram Association.

Gillogly was one of the earliest authors of personal computer software, writing utility programs, games and a computerized cookbook published by the Software Toolworks beginning in 1980.

Cryptanalysis
He is best known for his work solving or debunking some of the world's most famous unsolved codes. In 1980 he wrote a paper on unusual strings in the Beale Ciphers, and he received international media attention for being the first person to publicly solve parts 1-3 on the CIA's Kryptos sculpture in 1999. He also coordinates a large mailing list about the ciphers in the Voynich Manuscript.  On the PBS website, they report that he has been called "arguably the best non-government cryptanalyst in the U.S." in the field of classical (historical) cryptosystems.

In 1995 he deciphered a text enciphered by Robert H. Thouless who had hoped the message could prove that the dead could communicate with the living. Gillogly wrote his own software to decipher the text, which was in a variant of the playfair cipher.

Selected articles
Articles by Gillogly at rand.org, 1970–1994
MAX: A FORTRAN Chess Player", 1970, RAND Paper
Exploratory modeling: search through spaces of computational experiments", 1994, RAND Reprint
"The impact of response options and location in a microcomputer interview on drinking drivers' alcohol use self-reports", 1990, Rand Corporation, co-written with Ron D. Hay,s Robert  M. Bell, Laural A. Hill, Matthew W. Lewis, Grant N.  Marshall, Ronald Nicholas, Gordon Marlatt
"The Technology Chess Program", 1972, Artificial Intelligence, Volume 3, pp. 145–163 
Cryptograms from the Crypt
"The Beale Cipher: A Dissenting Opinion", April 1980, Cryptologia, Volume 4, Number 2
"Ciphertext-Only Cryptanalysis of Enigma", October 1995, Cryptologia, Volume 19, Number 4

See also
Cryptanalysis of the Enigma

References

External links
"Solving the Enigma of Kryptos", January 21, 2005, Wired News
"Cracking the Code of a CIA Sculpture", July 1999, Washington Post
"Interest grows in solving cryptic CIA puzzle after link to Da Vinci Code", June 11, 2005, The Guardian
"Swedish team beats code to win 10,000 pounds", October 12, 2000, The Daily Telegraph
"Decoding Nazi Secrets", by Jim Gillogly; November 2000, NOVA Online,  PBS
"Mission Impossible: The Code Even the CIA Can't Crack", April 20, 2009, Wired Magazine
"CIA Releases Analyst’s Fascinating Tale of Cracking the Kryptos Sculpture", June 5, 2013, Wired Magazine

Writers from California
Recreational cryptographers
Living people
Carnegie Mellon University alumni
American technology writers
1946 births
American cryptographers